The Horn is a mountain located in Coos County, New Hampshire. The mountain is part of the Pilot Range of the White Mountains. The Horn is flanked to the southwest by the Bulge.

The Horn stands within the watershed of the Upper Ammonoosuc River, which drains into the Connecticut River, and thence into Long Island Sound in Connecticut. The south face of the Horn drains into the headwaters of the West Branch of the Upper Ammonoosuc River. The northwest face of the Horn drains north, thence into the West Branch of Mill Brook, and into the Upper Ammonoosuc.

Unknown Pond lies to the northeast of the mountain and provides an excellent view of the peak. The open ledges on the summit face west, however, so it is difficult to see the pond from the top of the mountain. Because of The Horn's location in the northern White Mountains and its distance——from the nearest road, it is much less visited than other comparable summits in the White Mountains.

See also 

 List of mountains in New Hampshire
 White Mountain National Forest
 New England Hundred Highest

External links 
  
  PeakBagger.com: The Horn

Mountains of New Hampshire
Mountains of Coös County, New Hampshire
New England Hundred Highest